{
  "type": "ExternalData",
  "service": "geoshape",
  "ids": "Q7162240",
  "properties": {
    "title": "Penang Sentral",
    "description": "none",
  }
}

Penang Sentral is an intermodal transit-oriented development in Butterworth, Penang, Malaysia. Proposed as the main transportation hub for the State of Penang, and by extension, Greater Penang, the first phase of the Penang Sentral project opened on 22 November 2018.

Modeled after KL Sentral in Kuala Lumpur, the first phase of Penang Sentral will serve as the terminal for both public and intercity buses, and is physically connected to the adjacent Butterworth railway station and the Penang Ferry terminal. The project will eventually comprise an integrated terminal for all bus, rail and sea transportation services within Penang. Future phases of the project also include commercial, retail and residential developments.

History 

Touted as the gateway to northern Malaysia by its developers, the Penang Sentral project was announced by the then Malaysian Prime Minister, Abdullah Badawi in 2007. The project, covering a  site in the heart of Butterworth, was to be jointly undertaken by Malaysian Resources Corporation Berhad (MRCB) and Perlaburan Hartanah Bumiputera Berhad.

Veritas Architects was put in charge of the design works of the proposed transit-oriented development, while the construction of Phase 1 was allocated to a subsidiary of MRCB, Penang Sentral Sdn Bhd. Penang Sentral was modeled after KL Sentral, which also incorporated commercial and residential elements. The entire project was divided into eight phases, of which the second, third and fourth phases comprised a shopping complex, three office blocks and a 36-storey hotel respectively.

However, since its launch in 2007, the Penang Sentral project has suffered repeated delays. Land acquisition became the main stumbling block, as the parcels of land earmarked for the development were owned by several parties, namely the Malaysian federal government, the Penang state government, highway concessionaires and Keretapi Tanah Melayu, the national railway operator. As a result, construction of Phase 1 of Penang Sentral only began in earnest in 2015.

Station layout

Gallery

References

External links 
Penang Sentral Website

Transport in Penang